= Kagoshima Prefectural Government Building =

Skyscraper in Kagoshima, Kagoshima Prefecture, Japan

Coordinates: 31°33′37.5″N 130°33′29.5″E

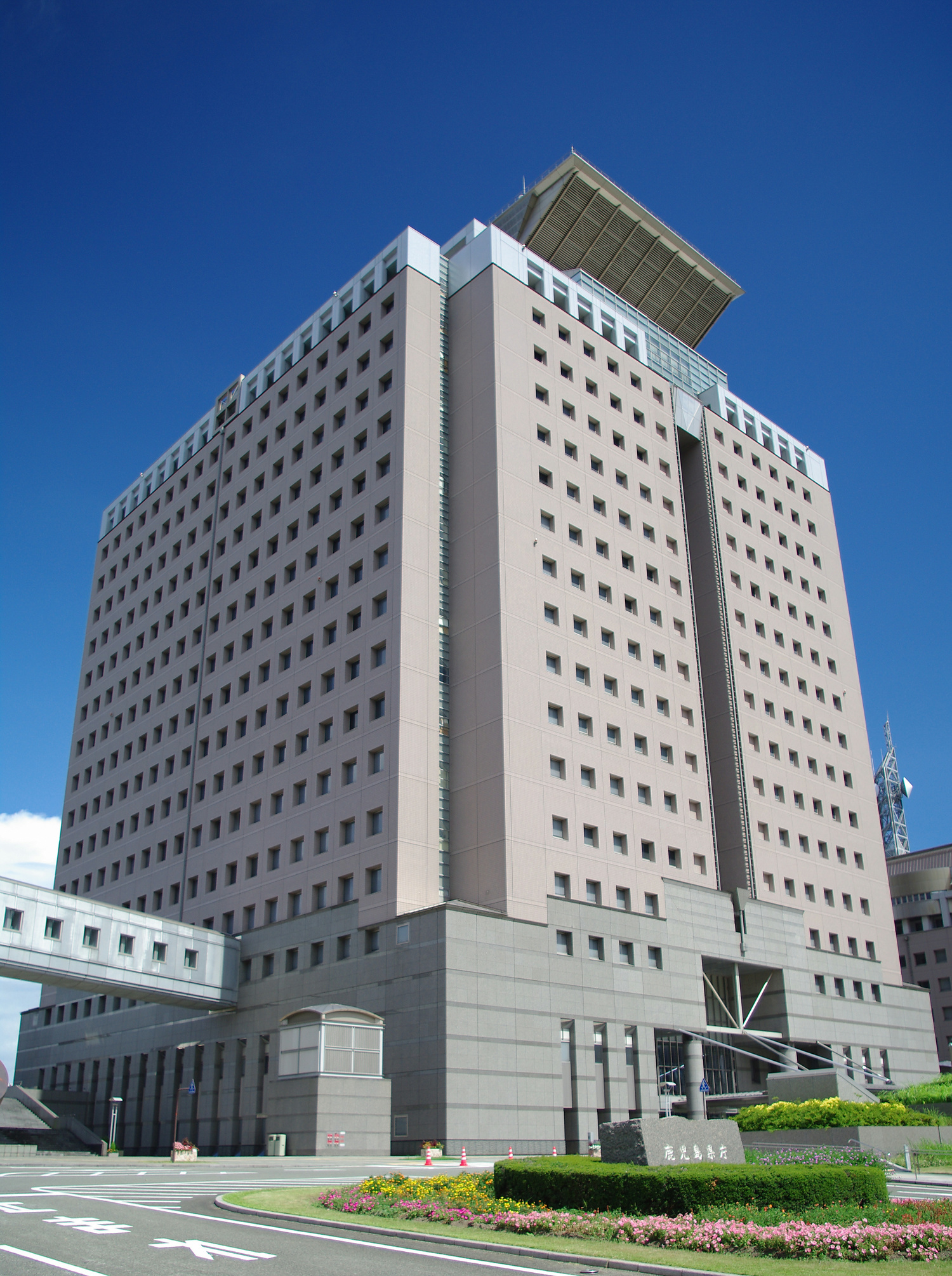
Kagoshima Prefectural Government Building

The Kagoshima Prefectural Government Building (鹿児島県庁舎, Kagoshima-ken Shōsha) is a skyscraper located in Kagoshima, Kagoshima Prefecture, Japan. Construction of the 93-metre, 18-storey skyscraper was finished in 1996.
